The Hope River is in the Tasman District of the South Island of New Zealand. It is the northernmost of three Hope Rivers in the South Island.

It flows east then south before joining the Buller River near Kawatiri Railway Station. A tributary called the Little Hope River rises near the Hope Saddle and flows southwest, joining the Hope River at Glenhope.  follows the valley of the Hope and then the Little Hope as it climbs towards the Hope Saddle en route to Nelson.

The river was named after G. W. Hope, who was secretary to Edward, Lord Stanley, the 14th Earl of Derby who later became Prime Minister of Great Britain.

References

Rivers of the Tasman District
Rivers of New Zealand